The Arch in the Town of Marshall, also known as Marshall Arch, is an arch spanning State Road 236 in downtown Marshall, Indiana, United States. Lettering on each side of the arch spells the town's name. The first work by Indiana architect Carroll O. Beeson, the arch was constructed in 1921. The town's business leaders commissioned the arch as a landmark for the town which was intended to improve the appearance of its business district. The arch was formally dedicated on September 30, 1921; the dedication honored the town's World War I veterans, although the arch was not intended to be a memorial. The structure remains in good condition and has become a popular attraction for visitors to the area.

In addition, The arch was added to the National Register of Historic Places on December 26, 1985.

See also
 Lusk Home and Mill Site, within Turkey Run State Park
 Richard Lieber Log Cabin, within Turkey Run State Park
 Beeson Covered Bridge
 Parke County Covered Bridges
 List of Registered Historic Places in Indiana
 Parke County Covered Bridge Festival

References

Buildings and structures on the National Register of Historic Places in Indiana
Buildings and structures completed in 1921
Buildings and structures in Parke County, Indiana
National Register of Historic Places in Parke County, Indiana